Karen Olsson is a writer.

Karen Ols(s)on may also refer to:

Karen Olsson (politician)
Karen Olson, charity worker
Karen Olson (The Faculty), fictional character

See also
Karen Olsen (disambiguation)
Karin Olsson (disambiguation)